Gojko Ćuk (born ) is a Montenegrin male volleyball player. He is part of the Montenegro men's national volleyball team. On club level he plays for Nice Volley-Ball, Nice Volleu-ball.

References

External links
 profile at FIVB.org

1988 births
Living people
Montenegrin men's volleyball players
Place of birth missing (living people)